Mauno Pekkala's cabinet  was the 31st government of the Republic of Finland. The cabinet's time period was from March 26, 1946, to August 29, 1948. It was Majority government. Pekkala's cabinet did many major reforms including the child benefit security.

Pekkala
1946 establishments in Finland
1948 disestablishments in Finland
Cabinets established in 1946
Cabinets disestablished in 1948